The Cleveland Indians are a Major League Baseball (MLB) franchise based in Cleveland, Ohio. They play in the American League Central division. Since the institution of MLB's Rule 4 Draft, the Indians have selected 67 players in the first round. Officially known as the "First-Year Player Draft", the Rule 4 Draft is MLB's primary mechanism for assigning amateur baseball players from high schools, colleges, and other amateur baseball clubs to its teams. The draft order is determined based on the previous season's standings, with the team possessing the worst record receiving the first pick. In addition, teams which lost free agents in the previous off-season may be awarded compensatory or supplementary picks.

Of the 67 players picked in the first round by Cleveland, 25 have been pitchers, the most of any position; 16 of them were right-handed, while 9 were left-handed. Eleven outfielders, eleven shortstops, four third basemen, four first basemen, three catchers, and one second basemen were also taken. The team also drafted one player, Glenn Tufts (1973), who played as an infielder. Twelve of the players came from high schools or universities in the state of California, and Texas follows with eight players. The Indians have also drafted two players from their home state of Ohio.

None of the Indians' first-round picks have won a World Series championship with the team, and no pick has been elected to the Hall of Fame. None of these picks have won the MLB Rookie of the Year award, although Manny Ramirez (1991) placed second in the voting in 1994. CC Sabathia (1998) is the only first-round pick of the Indians to earn a Cy Young Award with the team, winning in 2007. The Indians have never held the first overall pick in the draft, but have selected players with the second overall pick five times.

The Indians have made 11 selections in the supplemental round of the draft and 15 compensatory picks since the institution of the First-Year Player Draft in 1965. These additional picks are provided when a team loses a particularly valuable free agent in the previous off-season, or, more recently, if a team fails to sign a draft pick from the previous year. The Indians have failed to sign three of their first-round picks: John Curtis (1966), Calvin Murray (1989), and Alan Horne (2001). The Indians received no compensation for failing to sign Curtis, but received the 39th pick in 1990 and the 41st pick in 2002 for failing to sign Murray and Horne, respectively.

Key

Picks

See also
Cleveland Indians minor league players

Footnotes
 Through the 2012 draft, free agents were evaluated by the Elias Sports Bureau and rated "Type A", "Type B", or not compensation-eligible. If a team offered arbitration to a player but that player refused and subsequently signed with another team, the original team was able to receive additional draft picks. If a "Type A" free agent left in this way, his previous team received a supplemental pick and a compensatory pick from the team with which he signed. If a "Type B" free agent left in this way, his previous team received only a supplemental pick. Since the 2013 draft, free agents are no longer classified by type; instead, compensatory picks are only awarded if the team offered its free agent a contract worth at least the average of the 125 current richest MLB contracts. However, if the free agent's last team acquired the player in a trade during the last year of his contract, it is ineligible to receive compensatory picks for that player.
 The Indians lost their first-round pick in 1987 to the Baltimore Orioles as compensation for signing free agent Rick Dempsey.
 The Indians gained a compensatory first-round pick in 1988 from the San Francisco Giants for losing free agent Brett Butler.
 The Indians gained a supplemental first-round pick in 1988 for losing free agent Brett Butler.
 The Indians gained a supplemental first-round pick in 1990 for failing to sign draft pick Calvin Murray.
 The Indians gained a supplemental first-round pick in 1997 for losing free agent Albert Belle.
 The Indians lost their first-round pick in 1999 to the Baltimore Orioles as compensation for signing free agent Roberto Alomar.
 The Indians gained a supplemental first-round pick in 2000 for losing free agent Michael Jackson.
 The Indians gained a compensatory first-round pick in 2001 from the Boston Red Sox for losing free agent Manny Ramirez.
 The Indians gained a compensatory first-round pick in 2001 from the Chicago White Sox for losing free agent Sandy Alomar Jr.
 The Indians gained a supplemental first-round pick in 2001 for losing free agent Manny Ramirez.
 The Indians gained a supplemental first-round pick in 2001 for losing free agent David Segui.
 The Indians gained a supplemental first-round pick in 2002 for losing free agent Juan González.
 The Indians gained a supplemental first-round pick in 2002 for failing to sign draft pick Alan Horne.
 The Indians gained a compensatory first-round pick in 2003 from the Philadelphia Phillies for losing free agent Jim Thome.
 The Indians gained a supplemental first-round pick in 2003 for losing free agent Jim Thome.
 The Indians gained a supplemental first-round pick in 2005 for losing free agent Omar Vizquel.
 The Indians gained a supplemental first-round pick in 2006 for losing free agent Bob Howry.

References
General references

In-text citations

First-round draft picks
Cleveland Indians first-round draft picks